Brookfield Properties is a North American subsidiary of commercial real estate company Brookfield Property Partners, which itself is a subsidiary of alternative asset management company Brookfield Asset Management. It is responsible for the property management of the company's real estate portfolio, which includes facilities in the office, multi-family residential, retail, hospitality, and logistics industries.

Brookfield Properties operates corporate offices in New York City, Toronto, London, Sydney, and São Paulo. Brookfield Properties acquired General Growth Properties, one of the largest mall operators in the U.S., and merged it into Brookfield Properties in 2018.

History 

The company's roots go back to the early 1900s in Montreal, Quebec. It was known then as the Canadian Arena Company and operated the Montreal Arena. In a partnership with Toronto investors, it built the Arena Gardens in Toronto. In the 1920s, it built the Montreal Forum to house the Montreal Maroons and Montreal Canadiens National Hockey League franchises; from 1935 to 1957, the company also owned the Canadiens. The company was acquired by Edper Investments in 1970. During the 1970s, when the company was known as Carena Properties, it expanded its business into commercial real estate. After the Montreal Forum closed, the Forum was sold to competitor Canderel Properties.

In 1989, Carena acquired a 33% interest in Olympia & York Developments Ltd., developers of the World Financial Center in New York, and in 1990, Brookfield acquired a 50% interest in a portfolio of office properties in Toronto, Denver and Minneapolis from BCE Development Corporation. In 1994, this holding was increased to 100% and included BCE Place, now Brookfield Place, Brookfield Properties' flagship office complex in Toronto.

In 1996, Carena acquired a 46% interest in World Financial Properties, a corporation formed from the bankruptcy of Olympia & York, which included three of the four towers of the World Financial Center, One Liberty Plaza, 245 Park Avenue in Manhattan. That year, Carena changed its name to Brookfield Properties Corporation.

In 1997, Brookfield Properties purchased 45% of Gentra, Inc., owner of several commercial properties in Toronto.

2000s
In 2000, Brookfield Properties acquired a portfolio of Calgary office properties, including the Bankers Hall complex.

In April 2001, the company lost out to Silverstein Properties, Inc., on the lease of the World Trade Center in New York City before the complex was destroyed during the September 11 attacks.

In 2003, Brookfield Properties completed the spin-off of Brookfield Homes, now part of Brookfield Residential, Brookfield Asset Management's U.S.-based home building business.

In 2005, Brookfield Properties acquired a 25% interest in O&Y Properties Corporation and O&Y Real Estate Investment Trust, expanding the company's real estate portfolio in four Canadian cities.

In 2006, the company acquired Trizec Properties, which was founded in 1960 by William Zeckendorf, builder of Place Ville Marie.

2010s
In 2010, it entered into London and Australian markets by acquiring the 100 Bishopsgate development site in the City of London and 16 properties encompassing 8 million SF in three major Australian cities.

On Earth Day on April 22, 2010, the company was listed as one of Canada's "The Green 30" Organizations Based On Eco-Friendly Programs and Practices based on an employee poll.

In 2011, Brookfield Properties divested its residential group consisting of Carma Developers and Brookfield Homes (Ontario) Ltd. to merge with Brookfield Homes Corporation to form Brookfield Residential Properties Inc. That same year, Brookfield Properties changed its name to Brookfield Office Properties to reflect its focus on commercial office properties.

In 2013, Brookfield Office Properties Inc. became the largest office landlord in Los Angeles after acquiring MPG Office Trust Inc.'s downtown portfolio. MPG had been one of Southern California's most prominent real estate developers and a longtime L.A. office tower owner. The MPG buildings they acquired include the Gas Company Tower, 777 Tower and the Wells Fargo Center on Bunker Hill.

In June 2014, Brookfield Property Partners (BPY) completed their acquisition of Brookfield Office Properties (BPO). BPO common shares were de-listed from the Toronto Stock Exchange as of June 10, 2014, and from the New York Stock Exchange on June 20, 2014. Brookfield Property Partners is now the sole owner of all of the issued and outstanding common shares of BPO.

On August 28, 2018, Brookfield Property Partners acquired Chicago-based real estate investment trust and shopping mall operator GGP Inc. (General Growth Properties), and merged its assets into Brookfield Properties, for $9 billion. Brookfield immediately sold a 49% interest in each of three former GGP super-regional malls to CBRE Group, and a 49% interest in three other former GGP malls to TIAA subsidiary Nuveen, seeking additional joint ventures for its newly acquired malls.

In December 2018, Brookfield Properties took over the management of Forest City Realty Trust's real estate portfolio after the company was acquired by a fund affiliated with Brookfield Asset Management.

2020s 
In September 2020, the company's retail group announced a layoff of 20% of its workforce of about 2,000 people.

Zuccotti Park
The company is the owner of Zuccotti Park, a publicly accessible park adjacent to one of its office buildings near Wall Street in the Manhattan borough of New York City, that in September 2011 became a site of protests by Occupy Wall Street.  On October 11, 2011, Richard Clark, the company's CEO, sent a letter to NYC Police Commissioner Raymond Kelly requesting to "clear the park" as its use by Occupy Wall Street "violates the law, violates the rules of the Park, deprives the community of its rights of quiet enjoyment to the Park, and creates health and public safety issues." The request was later withdrawn. On November 15, 2011, at around 1:00 a.m., the NYPD went in and cleared the park citing alleged health and safety hazards caused by the protestors. Later that morning, Judge Lucy Billings issued a court order for the NYPD to allow the protesters back into the park. That injunction was subsequently lifted by the NY Supreme Court and the police were allowed to keep the park cleared of tents at the request of Brookfield Properties.

See also

 List of Brookfield Properties shopping malls
 List of real estate companies of Canada
 Boston Properties
 Silverstein Properties Inc.
 Vornado Realty Trust
 Cadillac Fairview
 Oxford Properties
 Green Parking Council
 Olympia and York – former firm from which many properties now belong to Brookfield

References

External links
 Brookfieldproperties.com – official website

Brookfield Asset Management
 
Companies formerly listed on the New York Stock Exchange
Companies based in Manhattan
Companies based in Toronto
Property management companies
Real estate companies of Canada
Real estate companies of the United States
Companies formerly listed on the Toronto Stock Exchange
Real estate companies established in 1923
1923 establishments in Quebec
Canadian companies established in 1923